La La Regira Field is a baseball stadium located in Donaldsonville, Louisiana, colloquially referred to as "The La La Field".
La La Regira Field is currently home to the Ascension Catholic High School baseball team.  It was previously used by the Donaldsonville Grays semi-pro baseball team, Donaldsonville High School and American Legion Baseball.

The bleachers are made of wood under a covered area with steel and brick supports.  The stadium holds 1,500 spectators.

References

Baseball venues in Louisiana
Donaldsonville, Louisiana
Sports venues in Louisiana
High school baseball venues in the United States